FEMM (sometimes recognized as an abbreviation for Far East Mention Mannequins) are a Japanese electronic dance music duo, composed of RiRi and LuLa. The group signed with the Avex Group Holdings Inc. sub-record label Maximum10 and their distributing label Avex Music Creative Inc.; they signed a deal with London label JPU Records for European distributions. After a series of buzz singles between 2013 and 2014, FEMM released their debut studio album Femm-Isation in October 2014 as a digital release. FEMM's major debut and first physical release, Pow!/L.C.S., was released in February 2016.

FEMM are a music project that portrays "real-life mannequins", whilst RiRi and LuLa are recognized as the leaders of the FEMM Agency Syndicate, an agency that supports the independence and rights of mannequins (hypothetically their fan base). RiRi is managed by agent Honey-B, and LuLa is managed by agent W-Trouble. Honey-B and W-Trouble communicate on RiRi and LuLa's behalf because mannequins cannot talk.

Despite the group's lack of charting success, FEMM have received prospects from several Western social media websites and journalists alike. The group have been widely commended for their fashion style and their commercial appeal, alongside the accompanying songs they have recorded. FEMM have been cited as the world's "first mannequin duo", and have been highlighted by publications including The Huffington Post and Perez Hilton online as future prospects for mainstream music.

Career

2013–early 2014: Formation and early work 

FEMM consists of RiRi and LuLa. Little is known about FEMM's formation or meeting prior to being signed; in an interview on February 24, 2016, W-Trouble stated that her and Honey-B "met at FEMM's Agency Syndicate. Details are top secret." In October 2013, the group launched a YouTube channel and uploaded a teaser video; The video shows RiRi and LuLa walking around the streets of Japan, talking about their quest of rescuing mannequins. This teaser was used to launch FEMM's website, which uses interactive elements to communicate with their fanbase. FEMM signed with the Avex Group Holdings Inc. sub-record label Maximum10 and their distributing label Avex Music Creative Inc.

In February 2014, FEMM premiered two music videos; "UFO" and "Astroboy" on their YouTube channel; the former track is a cover song originally recorded in 1977 by Japanese pop duo Pink Lady, whilst the latter track featured guest vocals from FEMM's agents, Honey-B and W-Trouble. Despite the initial lack of popularity, FEMM included both songs in the group's debut extended play (EP) Astroboy on April 2, 2014. "Astroboy" was recognized by Western critics as FEMM's first original song by the group. The videos were directed by creative unit IKIOI, who had previously worked with other Japanese artists at the time.

Mid-2014–2015: Femm-Isation, international recognition, and further promotion 

On April 12, 2014, FEMM released their debut single, "Wannabe", from their then-upcoming studio album. This marked their first single handled by Western producers and composers; "Wannabe" was produced by Australian production team Dreamlab, and Avex Music Creative Inc. hired several more Western producers for the album. The second, third, and fourth singles from the album; "Kiss the Rain", "White Noise", and "We Flood the Night" were released on April 30, May 7 and 14 that same year. Avex Music Creative Inc. had hired European producers, such as Swedish producer Andreas Carlsson and Danish production team GL Music. At the end of May, FEMM released their fifth single "Kill the DJ" alongside an accompanying music video on their YouTube channel. The music video, alongside the recording, was the beginning of FEMM's international recognition and received a large amount of favourable feedback, praising the concept, its convenient use of cosplay and otaku culture, and choreography.

In June 2014, FEMM premiered their sixth single "Fxxk Boyz Get Money" onto YouTube, and released it a month later on July 30 through iTunes Store. The song was critically acclaimed from many music critics, many whom praised the song's commercial nature and lyrical message. An accompanying music video was shot for the single; its features FEMM singing and twerking in an overlapped lyric video. The video received a large amount of favourable feedback, and attracted large attention from several online figures including American blogger and journalist Perez Hilton, American YouTube star Miles Jai, among others. Due to its increasing popularity, the song was featured on the Twerk' em All compilation in July that same year, and gained more international fans from all over the world. In November 2015, "Fxxk Boyz Get Money" surpassed one million views on YouTube; this marks FEMM's highest viewed and first video to reach the one million mark. In mid-July 2014, the duo performed at Tokyo in Tulsa, an anime convention in Oklahoma, which was their first performance in North America.

After the success and increasing popularity of "Kill the DJ" and "Fxxk Boyz Get Money", Avex Music Creative Inc. continued to hire several producers and composers from different European, Oceanic and North American regions. FEMM collaborated with American producer's and songwriter's Dan Book and Alexei Misoul on "Party All Night", the seventh single from their then-upcoming studio album. FEMM released their eighth single "Dead Wrong" on August 27 through iTunes Store. The single was produced by New Zealand-born Australian musician Leah Haywood, and accompanying producers Daniel James and Kevin Ross. "Unbreakable" served as FEMM's ninth single from the then-upcoming studio album, and was singled out as the only ballad by Honey-B and W-Trouble; the latter agent highlighted it as LuLa's favourite single. FEMM released their final single from the album, entitled "Whiplash". FEMM announced the release of their debut studio album, Femm-Isation, and was released on October 3 that same year. Despite the lack of success in their native Japan, Femm-Isation reached the top ten on the US Billboard World Albums chart; this marks FEMM's first charting release to date. The instrumental version of the album was released on December 24 through iTunes Store.

FEMM promoted the album and its accompanying singles with performances at small clubs or other public events in Japan. FEMM were part of a one-night only show for the Japanese leg tour of Dutch recording artist and songwriter Eva Simons, and FEMM performed all the album tracks on their Femm-Isation Vol.3 concert the following day; this gig was hosted at Hatsudai Tamai Hospital. FEMM performed alongside electronic musicians Afrojack, Alesso, Fedde Le Grand, Kaskade, and Martin Garrix amongst others at the annual Ultra Music Festival in Tokyo; this was FEMM's first musical performance at a live festival tour. FEMM performed at the Versace after party in Tokyo, and performed on several other concert gigs until December 2014. In August 2015, FEMM returned to the U.S. to perform at Rage, a gay bar and dance club in West Hollywood, California. In the same weekend, they were headline acts at the J-Pop Summit in San Francisco along with other Japanese music acts such as Eir Aoi, JAM Project, and Gacharic Spin, amongst others.

The group's final performance promoting material from Femm-Isation was for the 2015 YouTube FanFest Japan, where YouTube personalities and artists gathered together for a live streaming event. The duo introduced their new song, "PoW!", which was a returning track from their live performances. FEMM also released a collaboration music video with Japanese girl group FAKY with a Japanese cover of Sak Noel's "No Boyfriend" on the producer's YouTube channel on November 27, 2015.

2016: Pow!/L.C.S. and other ventures 

In early December 2015, FEMM confirmed in a press release through Avex Group Inc. that they would release their debut physical album, which was revealed to be entitled Pow!/L.C.S.. FEMM confirmed the EP would include two new tracks; the studio version of "Pow!", and "L.C.S.", alongside old remixes of their previous singles; they commented that they would add new re-edited versions of different tracks that didn't appear on their debut studio. In late January 2016, FEMM announced through a press release with Avex Group Inc. that they would release a double album in late February 2016 that included a physical copy of Femm-Isation. Regarding the material, FEMM agent Honey-B stated "The original order of the songs was already carefully mapped out, but this time round we got to put in segues in between songs which made a big difference. The songs flow so smoothly, it will seem like it all happens in a split second and like you have travelled in time." On February 3, Pow!/L.C.S. was released digitally through iTunes Stores and served a physical released on February 23. The music videos to "Pow!" and "L.C.S." premiered on FEMM's YouTube channel in January and February 2016. On April 27, 2016, they re-released YouTube videos of "White Noise" and "Whiplash" with minor changes to lyrics and new camera angles. On the same day, FEMM, FAKY and Yup'in were confirmed to be in a new Avex project group called "FAMM'IN" and released their first digital EP, FAMM'IN and music video of their title song, "Circle" on YouTube.

2017: 80s/90s J-Pop Revival project 
In May 2017, FEMM released a single, "Do It Again", that featured American songwriter Liz. In mid 2017, FEMM launched a project called "80s/90s J-Pop Revival" with a double A-side cover single, "My Revolution / Konyaha Boogie Back|今夜はブギー・バック (nice vocal)", which was released in September. It featured members from FAKY and Yup'in. It was followed by another single a week later and a cover album with the same name in October.

As a way to promote the singles, "Falling For A Lullaby", a B-side from "My Revolution" was used in an advertisement for the Karuizawa Prince Shopping Plaza. FEMM also performed at venues including Hyper Japan.

2018-2020: dollhouse 
In 2018, FEMM released "dollhouse" which included two recorded songs and a few instrumentals. To commemorate the EP, two live performances were held. In the same year, they released, "Dolls Kill", featuring Japanese Hip-hop artist, Elle Teresa.

in 2019, FEMM released their digital single, "Shibuya Ex Horologium".

In October 2020, FEMM released the final single, "Chewing Gum Cleaner", before erasing all content from their platforms.

2020-present: FEMM 2.0. and 404 Not Found 
In November 2020, FEMM announced that they were going to 'upgrade' to FEMM Version 2.0. and teased the song "Level Up" featuring Duke of Harajuku. The song was subsequently released as a single from their new EP "404 Not Found". To further promote their upcoming FEMM 2.0. studio album, they released the singles "Sugar Rush" and "Private Dancer" along with accompanying music videos. In late 2021, the duo released the song "Tokyo Girls Anthem", and in early 2022 they released an album of the same name as that single, supported through the singles "Tokyo Girls Anthem" and "We Got Each Other".

Artistry

Musical style and themes

FEMM's music has been described by several music critics and scholars as electronic dance music (EDM), with a variety of sub-elements including hip-hop, electronica, eurodance, and house music. According to Mike Kanert from Metropolis Magazine, he felt FEMM's music moved towards Americanized music, including hip-hop and club culture. A staff member from Arcadey.net commented that "FEMM's music mostly consists of regurgitated American EDM, dance-pop, and hip-hop, all of which is just as enjoyable as it is generic. I'm guessing it's supposed to be some kind of meta commentary on mainstream music and manufactured pop stars or something...". FEMM's debut studio album Femm-Isation shows several elements of electronic dance music; Greg Hignight from J-Generation.com reviewed the album and noted they album's ability to use J-Pop music and English language to convey messages to the Western audience; "Each song is its own little pop universe. The album's English lyrics also allow for an instant emotional connection with listeners, circumventing the language barrier that's often been a challenge for J-Pop." For FEMM's 2014 pop ballad "Unbreakable", the entire production relied on live orchestral instruments and was considered a "versatile" move by both fans and critics; According to W-Trouble, the song "relies on human feelings rather than of a mannequin." W-Trouble later commented "Unbreakable' is probably the song that expresses [human] feelings the most. The other songs are pretty rigid so I think they're closer to the image of mannequins."

The song writing to FEMM's music material explore themes of girl power, feminism, and freedom of speech; two examples are the tracks "Fxxk Boyz Get Money" and "Girls Night Out", both of which lyrically discussing female empowerment and not relying on male labor or assistance. Honey-B commented to an interviewer at Arama! Japan by stating, "We leave it to the listeners to decide about the message or feel of this track, but as for FEMM, they're singing about "girl power". It's okay to be sexy, just don't let them take advantage of you. "Fxxk Boyz Get Money" has very aggressive lyrics, but lots of women seem to relate to it. They call it their life anthem." For their first extended play Astroboy, both agents did not yet have any professional experience in singing. Honey-B and W-Trouble stated that the first time recording and appearing in a music video was challenging as they are not usually the ones in front of the camera. FEMM expressed that they would be honored to collaborate with any producers and songwriters who understand their message. Molly Osberg from Vice noted that FEMM combined Japanese fashion and music together. She commented "At least, that's how I imagine we get acts like FEMM, the mesmerizing J-pop electro duo with a backstory more inventive than anything on the SyFy channel right now." Osberg praised the producers and songwriters for being hidden pioneers in order to popularize the group, as she felt producers now were more "the frontmen". Corynn Smith from MTV Iggy was impressed by their English language skills and commented "The pair's overwhelmingly English discography has something for everyone with electronic taste, whether you're feeling like a romantic trance trip a la "We Flood the Night", craving a techno remix of '70s J-pop hit "UFO", or in a twerk-tastic, rubber-maid-outfit-clad "Fxxk Boyz Get Money" kinda mood."

Image

There are two roles that play out through the FEMM project; the mannequins and the agents. According to Honey-B, RiRi is a "combat" mannequin that wears "rather aggressive designs". According to W-Trouble, LuLa is described as a "babyfaced... housekeeper" that wears more "reserved" and "softer" designs of clothing. In a "fictional" description of the mannequins, Honey-B stated; "RiRi uses her combat skills to fight the anti-mannequins. She is really aggressive and takes on any challenge. She feels most comfortable in her military gear. LuLa's responsibility is to heal wounded mannequins, including RiRi. They depend on one another." Honey-B and W-Trouble are the "voices" of RiRi and LuLa, as the mannequins are portrayed with the inability to talk or vocally communicate. Honey-B stated, "For the musical nuances, it's listening that's important: the key is to match the sound and flow. If the nuance reveals a kind of attitude, it's partly due to the songwriting and partly due to [Honey-B]. According to FEMM, their tagline "Do Dolls Have Feelings? Do Their Songs Move People?" represents their virtual goal is to free all mannequins from human oppression.

FEMM's fan base are also recognized as agents and although they are categorized by their attributes, such as: military, pilot, medical, maid, spies, RiRi and LuLa are exclusive-attribute and exclusive-rank FEMM without any of the attributes and that is indicated in their serial numbers 000000. While performing and in public areas, FEMM stay in character and move with robot-like actions; they are sometimes carried on and off stage by staff members to underline mannequin characteristics. FEMM's live performances and music videos are choreographed by Japanese choreographing team Hidali, whilst many of the latex outfits are made by Shoichiro Matsuoka of GM Atelier.

Recognition
Several critics have commended the group for their diverse imagery and fashion style. A couple music critics from Singles Jukebox noted that FEMM were more widely noticed by Western audiences than the audience from Japan or J-pop culture. Kimi Li from What's a Greek blog compared the Japanese music towards Western culture, and stated "Japan's music industry has been seen to largely play catch up with the rest of the world. Major labels are slow to embrace streaming services. Japan's iTunes store is a wealth of anison, electro and pop but only a small fraction of that is available globally." Li found that although Korean pop music "catapulted" into Western culture, Li stated that FEMM were one of very few Japanese acts to emphasize an Americanized appeal.

The group have found success through Western publications and have been listed in their top acts list; In October 2014, MTV Iggy listed FEMM as their "Artist to Watch" from a public vote. Colin McQuistan from The Huffington Post listed FEMM as one of their top six acts of 2016; McQuistan stated "I'm talking about FEMM, a deceptively slick production from Japan featuring two very real humans Honey-B and W-Trouble (sigh) who claim to 'stand up for the rights of mannequins worldwide' (double sigh). But who cares what their shtick is; the music is super commercial, catchy and very cleverly written pop."

Philanthropy
In 2015, FEMM uploaded videos to their YouTube channel of them and female back-up dancers performing "Fxxk Boyz Get Money" and "Anaconda" by Trinidian-American recording artist and rapper Nicki Minaj in a Tokyo bath house. The short videos were in support of the "Dance is Not a Crime" campaign that were hosted by FEMM, which was in protest of Japan's legislation where night clubs would be closed at midnight and prohibited "no dancing" signs at several clubs and areas. The Businesses Affecting Public Morals Regulation Act, which was introduced in 1948, prohibited people to dance within 66 metres from night clubs after a certain cut-off time, despite public retaliation; law and police department enforcements increased by 2011. FEMM protested the law throughout 2015, using hashtags on several social media websites and through music videos; the video was advertised by Japanese record label Dimension Point and included "Fxxk Boyz Get Money" on their compilation album.

Discography 

Studio albums
 Femm-Isation (2014)
 80's/90's J-Pop Revival (2017)
 Tokyo Girls Anthem (2021)
 Tokyo Ex Machina (2022)

Extended plays
 Astroboy (2014)
 Pow!/L.C.S. (2016)
 Dollhouse (2018)
 404 Not Found  (2020)
 THE SIX (2022)

References

External links 

Japanese women pop singers
Japanese female models
Japanese dance music groups
Japanese electropop groups
J-pop music groups
Japanese girl groups
Japanese electronic music groups
Pop music duos
Musical groups established in 2013
2013 establishments in Japan
Japanese musical duos
Female musical duos
Bands with fictional stage personas
Japanese women in electronic music
English-language singers from Japan
Electronic music duos